Rainn or RAINN may refer to:

Rainn Wilson (born 1966), American actor
Rape, Abuse & Incest National Network